The Manitoba Group is a stratigraphical unit of middle to late Devonian age in the Western Canadian Sedimentary Basin. 

The group takes its name from the province of Manitoba, and was first defined by A.D. Baillie in 1953.

Lithology
The Manitoba Group is composed of alternating cycles of shale, carbonate and evaporite.

Distribution
The Manitoba Group occurs in outcrop in southwestern Manitoba and in the sub-surface in southern Saskatchewan, North Dakota and Montana.

Subdivisions
The following formationas are recognised, from top to bottom:
The Souris River Formation appears in the upper part of the Manitoba Group, is of Givetian to Frasnian age and consists of thin shale-carbonate-evaporite cycles.
The Hubbard Evaporite is recognised at the top of the Montana Group in the Elk Point Basin. Its age is Givetian
The Dawson Bay Formation is the lower part of the Manitoba Group. It is of Givetian age and consists of red shale (the "Second Red Bed") and a sequence of limestone and dolomitic limestone.

Relationship to other units

The Manitoba Group is conformably overlain by the Duperow Formation and disconformably overlays the Prairie Evaporite Formation or Winnipegosis Formation of the Elk Point Group.

The lower Manitoba Group is equivalent to the Muskeg Formation in northern Alberta, while the upper part correlates with the Beaverhill Lake Formation.

References

Stratigraphy of Saskatchewan
Stratigraphy of Manitoba
Devonian southern paleotropical deposits
Middle Devonian Series
Upper Devonian Series